Buoyancy is a 2019 Australian drama film directed by Rodd Rathjen. It was selected as the Australian entry for the Best International Feature Film at the 92nd Academy Awards, but it was not nominated.

Plot
Inspired by actual events, a 14-year-old Cambodian boy becomes a victim of human trafficking when he is enslaved on a Thai fishing trawler.

Cast
 Sarm Heng as Chakra
 Thanawut Kasro as Rom Ran (first trafficker)
 Mony Ros as Kea
 Saicheer Wongwirot as Kadir (second trafficker)

Release
The film's premiere took place at the 2019 Berlin International Film Festival.

Critic Paul O'Callaghan assessed the film as a "terse minimalist thriller" about slavery in southeast Asia. Screen Dailys Sarah Ward credited Heng with "a captivating lead" with "a rawness to his performance".

Awards

See also
 List of submissions to the 92nd Academy Awards for Best International Feature Film
 List of Australian submissions for the Academy Award for Best International Feature Film

References

External links
 

2019 films
2019 drama films
Australian drama films
Khmer-language films
Films about slavery
Thai-language films